Yandian is a town under the administration of Linqing City in northwestern Shandong province, China, located  southwest of downtown Linqing and bordering Hebei to the northwest. , it has 34 villages under its administration.

See also 
 List of township-level divisions of Shandong

References 

Township-level divisions of Shandong